Kasganj violence took place on 26 January 2018, in Kasganj, a district in Western Uttar Pradesh, when 22-year-old student of commerce named Chandan Gupta died by gunshot of an Islamist in a Muslim-majority locality of Kasganj during an "Tiranga bike rally" organised by Akhil Bharatiya Vidyarthi Parishad, the student wing of the ruling Bharatiya Janata Party in the state to mark the 69th Republic Day.

Background 
On 26 January 2018, A Tiranga yatra was organized by members of the local unit of the BJP-affiliated students' group, Akhil Bharatiya Vidyarthi Parishad (ABVP) to mark the 69th Republic Day. The clash came about after a group in Badu Nagar objected to nationalistic slogans being raised via bike-borne members of the Tiranga Yatra, which had started out from the Bilram Gate area. But as per police, the clash broke out when a member of the student union allegedly slapped by the Muslim group. A 22 years old, Chandan Gupta, was shot dead, and another man named Noushad was admitted to a hospital in Aligarh district after being shot in the leg. Later, the shops were burnt and property was vandalized while returning from the cremation of Chandan Gupta by mobsters. The mobsters were mainly from Muslim community. The injured and dead were from Hindu families Chandan Gupta who was shot by a Muslim youth Saleem Javed.

Aftermath  
A special team was set up by the Uttar Pradesh Police. UP CM Yogi Adityanath  condoled the loss of life in the Kasganj violence and urged people to maintain peace and harmony. The government shut down internet service in the district.  On 28 January, 81 people were arrested.

Dr Puja Shakun Pande, state president of the Hindu Mahasabha, was held under preventive detention in her house.

Ram Naik has described the Kasganj communal clashes as a "blot" on the UP state.

Former UP CM and Bahujan Samaj Party chief Mayawati blamed the BJP government for the communal violence and criticed the Yogi Adityanath government in the state. Kalraj Mishra termed the incident 'very unfortunate'.

References

Riots and civil disorder in Uttar Pradesh
Conflicts in 2018
2018 in India
History of Uttar Pradesh (1947–present)
2012 disasters in India
Kasganj district
Religiously motivated violence in India